Jordan Creek is a stream in Clinton and DeKalb counties of Missouri. It is a tributary of the Little Third Fork of the Platte River.

The stream flows northwest into DeKalb County and turns north crossing under U.S. Route 36. The confluence is south of the community of Bayfield and approximately one-quarter mile east of the Dekalb-Buchanan county line.

The name may be a transfer from the Jordan River in West Asia.

See also
List of rivers of Missouri

References

Rivers of Clinton County, Missouri
Rivers of DeKalb County, Missouri
Rivers of Missouri